Rabochaya Gazeta was an illegal social democratic newspaper in the Russian Empire, published in 1897 in Kiev. It was an organ of the Russian Social Democratic Labour Party (RSDLP). The editors included Boris L. Eidelman, P. L. Tuchapsky and N. A. Vigdorchik.

History 
The social democrats grouped around Rabochaya Gazeta maintained contact with the Emancipation of Labour group and the Saint Petersburg League of Struggle for the Emancipation of the Working Class. They also helped preparations for the convocation of the first party congress.

In March 1898, the First Congress of the RSDLP recognised Rabochaya Gazeta as the official party organ. The third issue, which was ready for the compositor, was seized by the police.

In 1899, the Central Committee of the Jewish Labour Bund tried to resume publication of the newspaper. Vladimir Lenin wrote, from his exile in Siberia, three articles for the unpublished third issue: Our Programme, Our Immediate Task and An Urgent Question.

See also 
Rabochaya Gazeta (1922)

References

Further reading 
 Our Programme by Vladimir Lenin at the Marxists Internet Archive
 Our Immediate Task by Vladimir Lenin at the Marxists Internet Archive
 An Urgent Question by Vladimir Lenin at the Marxists Internet Archive

Newspapers published in the Russian Empire
Publications established in 1897
Publications disestablished in 1898
Mass media in Kyiv
Defunct newspapers published in Russia
Defunct newspapers published in Ukraine
Russian-language newspapers